Mount Hope Cemetery is a cemetery in Lansing, Michigan.

History
Mount Hope Cemetery opened as the new city cemetery for Lansing, Michigan in June 1874. It was formerly the John Miller Farm. Between 1874 and 1881, the city vacated the Lansing City Cemetery and moved about 1,000 graves to Mount Hope.

Frederick W. Higgins, superintendent of Detroit's Woodmere Cemetery, planned the drives and Henry Lee Bancroft, superintendent of the Lansing City Cemetery, developed the landscape.

A section was platted in 1874 for the State Reform School (later the Boys' Vocational School) for the remains of 61 boys who died between 1856 and 1933.

The city's Civil War Soldier's Monument, a large obelisk, was dedicated in 1878.

In 2014, a grave marker for the final victim of the 1927 Bath School bombing was dedicated.

As of 2017, there were 23,820 people buried at Mount Hope Cemetery.

Notable burials
 Warren Babcock (1866–1913), postmaster
 L. Anna Ballard (1848–1934), physician
 William James Beal (1833–1924), botanist
 Willard I. Bowerman Jr. (1917–1987), state politician and mayor of Lansing
 Claude E. Cady (1878–1953), member of the U.S. House of Representatives
 Sherlock Houston Carmer (1842–1884), state politician
 John Herrmann (1900–1959), writer
 Grant M. Hudson (1868–1955), member of the U.S. House of Representatives
 Irma Theoda Jones (1845–1929), philanthropist
 Patrick H. Kelley (1867–1925), member of the U.S. House of Representatives
 John W. Longyear (1820–1875), jurist and member of the U.S. House of Representatives
 Martin V. Montgomery (1840–1898), judge
 Jack Morrissey (1876–1936), professional baseball player
 Ransom E. Olds (1864–1950), automotive industry leader
 George E. Ranney (1839–1915), Civil War surgeon and Medal of Honor recipient
 James Munroe Turner (1850–1896), state politician and mayor of Lansing
 Scott Turner (1880–1972), director of the U.S. Bureau of Mines
 Howard Wiest (1864–1945), Chief Justice of the Michigan Supreme Court
 Edward W. Sparrow (1846–1913), Lansing Developer and founder of Sparrow Hospital

See also
 List of cemeteries in Michigan

References

External links
 Mount Hope Cemetery (official website)

Cemeteries in Michigan
1874 establishments in Michigan